John K. Stargel (born May 14, 1964) is an American politician and judge in Florida.

Stargel was a Representative in the Florida House of Representatives. He received his bachelor's degree from the University of Tampa in 1987. In addition, he received his Juris Doctor from Florida State University in 1991. He lives in Lakeland, Florida with his family. In 2006, he was elected as a circuit judge and in 2008 his wife, Kelli Stargel, was elected to his former seat in the Florida House.

References

External links
Official Bio for Representative Stargel
Official Bio for Judge Stargel

Florida State University alumni
Republican Party members of the Florida House of Representatives
1964 births
Living people
People from Somerset, Kentucky
University of Tampa alumni
Florida state court judges
21st-century American judges